Bolan Boogie is a compilation album by the English glam rock band T. Rex. After Marc Bolan had left Fly Records to form his own label distributed through EMI/T. Rex Wax Co, his former label released this compilation in 1972 with recent single A- and B-sides recorded in 1970 and 1971, many of which had not appeared on previous albums. Also included are album tracks from Tyrannosaurus Rex's Unicorn (1969), A Beard of Stars (1969) and T. Rex's T. Rex (1970).

Release 
Bolan Boogie was released in May 1972 by the Fly record label. It reached number one on the UK Albums Chart.

Track listing

Personnel 

 Marc Bolan – vocals, guitar
 T. Rex

Technical

 Tony Visconti – production

Charts

References 

1972 compilation albums
T. Rex (band) albums
Albums produced by Tony Visconti
Glam rock compilation albums
Fly Records compilation albums